Chance Brothers and Company was a glassworks originally  based in Spon Lane, Smethwick, West Midlands (formerly in Staffordshire), in England. It was a leading glass manufacturer and a pioneer of British glassmaking technology.

The Chance family originated in Bromsgrove in Worcestershire  as farmers and craftsmen, before setting up business in Smethwick in 1822. Situated between Birmingham and the Black Country in the agglomeration of the  Midlands industrial heartland, they took advantage of the skilled workers, canals and many advances that were taking place in the industrial West Midlands at the time.

Throughout its almost two centuries of history many changes affected the company which, now privatised, continues to function as Chance Glass Limited, a specialised industrial glass manufacturer in Malvern, Worcestershire at one of its small subsidiary factories. The social and economic impact of the company on the region is the subject of a project sponsored by the Heritage Lottery Fund.

History

19th century

Robert Lucas Chance (8 October 1782 – 7 March 1865), known as 'Lucas', bought the British Crown Glass Company's works in Spon Lane in November 1822. The company specialised in making crown window glass. The company ran into difficulty and its survival was guaranteed in 1832 by investment from Chance's brother, William (29 August 1788 – 8 February 1856) who owned an iron factoring business in Great Charles Street, Birmingham. After the partnership with the Hartley Brothers was dissolved in 1836, Lucas and William Chance became partners in the business, which was renamed Chance Brothers and Company.

Chance Brothers was amongst the earliest glass works to carry out the cylinder process in Europe, and the company became known as  "... the greatest  glass manufacturer in Britain." In 1832, it made the first British cylinder blown sheet glass using French and Belgian workers. In 1839, a new process to grind the surfaces of plate glass was patented by James Timmins Chance. In 1848 under the supervision of Georges Bontemps, a French glassmaker from Choisy-le-Roi, who had purchased the secret of the stirrer after the deaths of Pierre Louis Guinand and Joseph von Fraunhofer, the pioneers of the manufacture of high-precision lenses for observatory telescopes, a new plant was set up to manufacture crown and flint glass for lighthouse optics, telescopes and cameras.  Bontemps agreed to share the secret with Chance Brothers and stayed in England to collaborate with them for six years. Just three other companies in Britain made glass in the same way, Pilkington of St Helens, Hartleys of Sunderland and Cooksons of Newcastle. During 1832, Chance Brothers became the first company to adopt the cylinder method to produce sheet glass, and became the largest British manufacturer of window and plate glass, and optical glasses.

Other Chance Brothers projects included glazing the Crystal Palace to house the Great Exhibition of 1851, and the Houses of Parliament, (built 1840–1860). At that time it was the only firm able to make the opal glass for the four faces of the Westminster Clock Tower which houses the famous bell, Big Ben. The ornamental windows for the White House in America were also made there. Other products included stained glass windows, ornamental lamp shades, microscope glass slides, painted glassware, glass tubing and specialist types of glass.

They made a 24-inch (62 cm) flint glass lens for the Craig telescope. The French lens craftsman George Bontemps helped on the project, which for its day was a very large lens. They only made part of the lens which was a doublet, Thames Plate Glass Company made the other part.

In 1870 Chance Brothers took over the failing Nailsea Glassworks in Somerset, but problems with coal supply led to the closure of that business.

Elihu Burritt (1810–1879) the American philanthropist and social activist, once said about Chance, "In no other establishment in the world can one get such a full idea of the infinite uses which glass is made to serve as in these immense works."

In 1900 a baronetcy was created for James Timmins Chance (22 March 1814 – 6 January 1902), a grandson of William Chance who had started the family business in 1771. James became head of Chance Brothers until his retirement in 1889, when the company became a public company and its name changed to Chance Brothers & Co. Ltd. Sir James Chance was the first baronet.

20th century
The company in partnership with the Ministry of Munitions' Optical Munitions and Glass Department expanded significantly during World War I 

In the early 20th century, many new ways of making glass evolved at Chance Brothers such as the innovative welding of a cathode ray tube used for radar detection.

In 1933, the company was reported to be involved in an attempt to contact "any intelligent life" on the planet Mars, using adapted lighthouse optics from a mountaintop, the Jungfrau, in Switzerland.

Chance also popularised slumped glass tableware, Fiestaware that included many innovative designs, including the famous Swirl pattern (1955), and also Lace (1951), Night Sky (1957), Green Leaves (1958), Calypto (1959), with floral depictions from 1965 with Anemone.

During world War II, the company was involved in production of cathode ray tubes for early radar sets, making up to 7,000 per week. In 1943 the artist Mervyn Peake was commissioned by the War Artists' Advisory Committee, WAAC, to paint pictures recording such work.

Pilkington Brothers acquired a 50% shareholding in 1945 but the Chance operation continued to be largely separately managed and a factory was established in Malvern, Worcestershire in 1947 to specialise in laboratory glass where the operation was incorporated as an arms-length subsidiary. In 1948 the Malvern plant produced the world's first interchangeable syringe. By the end of 1952 Pilkington had assumed full financial control of Chance Brothers, but were not actively involved in its management until the mid- to late-1960s. When plastic disposable syringes displaced glass in the late 1960s, the range of its precision bore product was diversified.

The production of flat glass ceased at Smethwick in 1976. The remainder of the works closed in 1981 ending more than 150 years of glass production at Smethwick and all flat glass production was absorbed by Pilkington's St Helens factories. Remaining glass tube processing, especially the manufacture of syringes and laboratory glassware, was moved to the Malvern plant.

In 1992, during a period of rationalisation at Pilkingtons, a management buy-out reverted the Chance plant in Malvern to private ownership and it became an independent company, changing its registered name to Chance Glass Limited, but retaining the historical Chance logo. Since then the company has continued to develop its range of products and processes, and areas now served include the pharmaceutical, chemical, metrology, electronics and lighting industries.

Technology

Lighthouses

From 1851, Chance Brothers became a major lighthouse engineering company, producing optical components, machinery, and other equipment for lighthouses around the world. James Timmins Chance pioneered placing lighthouse lamps inside a cage surrounded by fresnel lenses to increase the available light output; the cages, known as optics, revolutionised lighthouse design. Another important innovation from Chance Brothers was the introduction of rotating optics, allowing adjacent lighthouses to be distinguished from each other by the number of times per revolution that the light flashes. John Hopkinson, the noted English physicist and engineer, invented this system, while employed at Chance Brothers.

Rolled-plate glass
One of Chance's major contributions was the development of rolled-plate glass. During the 20th century, rolled-plate glass became the mainstay of the company's operation.

Clock faces
The German opal glass in the faces of the clock in the Clock Tower, Palace of Westminster (housing Big Ben) of the Houses of Parliament were damaged by Luftwaffe bombs during World War II. The damaged glass pieces needed to be replaced, but because of a difference in colour, it was decided to replace all the glass. The glass replaced by Chance Brothers was opal glass.

Large glass
In about 1848, Chance was one of the first companies to produce very long pieces of window glass, following technology developed as a result of finding a solution for an order from Joseph Paxton for a large greenhouse on the Chatsworth estate of the Dukes of Devonshire. It led to a contract to glaze the Crystal Palace in 1851 and which earned Joseph Paxton a knighthood.

Ultraviolet
Based on technology by Sir William Crookes, Chance Brothers was responsible for perfecting the manufacture of glass for the earliest optical lenses to block harmful ultraviolet rays from the sun while retaining transparency. Chance continued to  use Crookes as a tradename into the 1960s.

Cathode ray tubes
Chance developed cathode ray tubes (CRTs) just before the outbreak of World War II. Using Hysil glass, a borosilicate glass similar to Pyrex, Chance became a major contributor to developing new methods for producing cathode ray tubes during World War II that were the precursors of CRT television screen. The tubes at that time were used for radar detection displays.

Precision bore tubing
Chance Bros developed precision bore glass tubing under the trade name Veridia in the 1950s.

Heritage site
The glassworks lies between the Birmingham Canal Navigations (BCN) Old Main Line and New Main Line canals near the Spon Lane locks and has several Grade II listed warehouses and adjacent canal bridges on the BCN New Main Line. The works lie within the Smethwick Summit - Galton Valley Conservation area. There is a listed memorial to James Timmins Chance, one of the partners, in West Smethwick Park.

Chance Brothers Ltd archives

The archives of Chance Brothers Ltd are held at Sandwell Community History and Archives Service. Additional papers are held at the Cadbury Research Library, University of Birmingham.

See also
Chance baronets

References

Bibliography

Further reading

 
  Printed for private circulation by Spottiswoode, Ballantyne & Co. (a postscript was added in 1926)

External links

Chance Glass Ltd - Website for the Malvern company
Chance Heritage Trust - The organisation involved with the restoration of the Chance Brothers' site.
The Infinite Uses of Glass, West Midlands industrial history project
The Domestic Glassware of Chance - Pressed and slumped glassware produced by Chance Brothers, 1929–1981
Chance Brothers Archive Catalogue

Images of England listed buildings

Defunct glassmaking companies
Lighthouse builders
Grade II listed buildings in the West Midlands (county)
British companies established in 1824
Manufacturing companies established in 1824
Companies based in Smethwick
Malvern, Worcestershire
1824 establishments in England
Defunct manufacturing companies of England